The Adelaide Footy League, formerly known as the South Australian Amateur Football League (SAAFL), is a semi-professional Australian rules football competition based in Adelaide, South Australia. Comprising sixty-seven member clubs playing over one hundred and ten matches per week, the SAAFL is one of Australia's largest Australian rules football associations.

The league currently provides competition across eight Senior divisions with Reserves grades, accompanied by a separate C grade competition, all from Divisions 1 to 7.

History 

The league was officially formed on 8 March 1911 and the first match was played on 6 May 1911.  With the exception of recesses during the two World Wars, the competition has been continuous since that time.

The South Australian Football Association (later to be renamed to South Australian National Football League) had existed as a competition since 1877, but by the early 1900s was structured on an "electorate system" where players qualified for clubs on the basis of electoral boundaries.  Adelaide University Football Club was keen to field a team in the SAFA competition and applied each year from 1906 to 1910.  Each time the application was rejected as it was felt the inclusion of a university team would threaten the electorate system.

In 1910 the Adelaide University Sports Association thought the case for admission to SAFA would be strengthened if the University had a team playing successfully in regular competition. It was felt that this could be achieved by forming a purely amateur league with other clubs not already in an association. By late 1910 Glenferrie, Marlborough and St. Bartholomew clubs had agreed to join with University to form the new association based on amateur principles. By 1911, as preparations were in hand for the inaugural season, the four clubs had become five with the inclusion of St. Francis Xavier.  The clubs also had agreed to admit late applicant Semaphore Central for the 1912 season.

In that first season only three ovals were used for matches – Jubilee Oval, Price Oval and University Oval.  Price Oval (now known as Hawthorn Oval) in Mitcham and University Oval (at the corner of Sir Edwin Smith Avenue and War Memorial Drive) both still exist today.  The Jubilee Oval however was built upon by the university in 1946.

Throughout the history of the league there have been many clubs join and leave the league. Affiliation peaked in 2001 with 72 clubs. Of the founding clubs, only Adelaide University remains.

The 2010 season marked the 100th year of the league, with the last day in September won by Henley, who won their first Division 1 premiership in history.

In 2017 the league decided to change its name from the South Australian Amateur Football League  to the Adelaide Footy League.

Division 1

Club-by-club summary 
This table summarises the total Division 1 premierships and grand finals from 1911 to 2022.

Notes

Grand Finals 
The following list summarises the Division 1 Grand Finals from 1911 to 2022.

Current Clubs 
The following table summarizes the member clubs of the league for the 2022 season.

Division 1 – Venue Locations 

The following 10 clubs are competing in Division 1 of the Adelaide Footy League 2023 season.

Controversy

Violence and Abuse 
The league has received media publicity over a number of incidents occurring at matches in recent years.

2005
 After the 2005 Division 4 Grand Final, Salisbury West forfeited promotion, had premiership points deducted for the 2006 season and five players received a total of 38 games suspension following a number of violent incidents during their heavy loss to Payneham Norwood Union.

2011
 Spectators at West Croydon were approached by sex workers during junior games to offer their services.

2012
 19 May – Police were called after a spectator wielded a knife and another used a broken beer bottle as a weapon in a fight during a match between Ingle Farm and Trinity Old Scholars. Ingle Farm had to hire security guards and ban drinking in certain areas for their remaining home games of the season.
 10 June – Three players were allegedly involved in an incident where their names were signed in permanent marker on a bar whilst representing the SAAFL in Tasmania as part of the Under-23 representative team.

2013
 25 May: An alleged brawl involving up to 20 people occurred in the car park during a match involving Smithfield and Ingle Farm.
 25 May: A Westminster Old Scholars player was allegedly attacked with a glass bottle during a match.
 1 June: A Central United player was banned for life following a 'disgusting' act where he smeared faeces on the door of the umpires' changeroom following a match against Blackfriars Old Scholars.
 June: One player was sentenced to eight months jail following a "coward punch" against an opponent in a C2 Division match between Adelaide Lutheran and Seaton Ramblers.
 15 June: Aboriginal Salisbury North coach Eugene Warrior was racially abused by a Henley supporter.
 20 July: Two Smithfield players reported for striking a player and abusing umpires resulted in the Smithfield club being suspended from the league for the rest of the season.
 7 September: Police were called after the Division 7 Grand Final between Ingle Farm and Angle Vale was called off with 10 minutes remaining when a wild brawl broke out between spectators.
 27 September: A Salisbury North player was banned for life as a result of an incident in the Division 1 Grand Final, and two other Salisbury North players were also suspended.
 Central United had 10 Category A reports during the season, resulting in a combined total of 36 games suspension, with one player banned for life.
 Salisbury North had eight suspensions for a total of 35 games.
 Salisbury West punished three players who abused umpires by forcing them to officiate games without pay.

2014
 Smithfield were reinstated to the competition with stipulations around player behavior. An incident in its Under 18 team involving umpire abuse and intimidation resulted in that team being withdrawn. Its coach was suspended for 18 months, one player was suspended for 8 matches, two other players suspended for four and two games. The club was also fined $2,000, and the A-Grade and B-Grade teams were penalised 8 premiership points each.
 Central United were deducted nine premiership points as a result of a player being suspended for spitting at and striking another player in a game played on 19 July 2014 against Blackfriars Old Scholars.
 Salisbury and Ingle Farm's Under 18 teams were each deducted six premiership points for involvement in a wild melee.
 A North Pines player was suspended for 32 weeks, resulting in a life ban, for attempting to headbutt, threatening and abusing an umpire and racial vilification during a Division 7 Semi-Final against Adelaide University. The match resulted in a forfeit after the North Pines team walked off the field to protest the umpiring and three of its players being reported. The team's coach was suspended for 12 months, every North Pines player was suspended for 4 games (suspended until the end of the 2017 season) and North Pines was fined $2000.

2015
 An Eastern Park player was suspended for ten weeks for recklessly knocking out an umpire's tooth in an on-field collision on 12 April 2015.
 Ingle Farm were forced to forfeit their C4 game against Pulteney on 9 May 2015 as a result of the club having no players available to play after a bench clearing brawl against Rosewater the previous week. One Ingle Farm player was banned for life after being identified as the instigator by the league's investigation committee.
 Salisbury's Under-18 Coach was suspended for the rest of 2015 and all of 2016 for failing to stop a melee that occurred during an Under-18 game against Mitcham on 10 May 2015, and for misleading the tribunal during the investigation. The club was also fined $500, one player suspended for six games, and the team was forced to forfeit its following two games due to lack of players.
 A Rosewater player was suspended for four matches for abusing and threatening an umpire during their 13 June game against Pulteney.
 Salisbury North were deducted eight premiership points for each of their teams and fined $4,000 following an incident in a C-Grade game against Plympton on 18 July.  A player was suspended for 10 games for striking and misconduct, and the C-Grade team was suspended for the remainder of the season.
 Four people were arrested, including two allegedly armed with knives, following a brawl between two warring families during a junior game between Rosewater and West Croydon.
 Eastern Park and Salisbury West forfeited their junior games for one week as a result of an incident involving shoving and verbal abuse between parents from both clubs at an under-12 game on 2 August.

2016
 A Rosewater player was suspended for eight games for abusing and threatening an umpire during their 18 June game against CBC Old Collegians.
 A Rosewater player was suspended for 20 years and the club suspended from the competition after he pleaded guilty to striking an umpire in a Division 5 game against Blackfriars Old Scholars on 16 July. Another player was reported for undue rough play in the same game and refused to leave the ground until the umpire asked the Rosewater coach to remove him from the ground. Further controversy occurred the following weekend when a picture showing players doing an obscene hand gesture with a caption reading "f*** u saafl" was posted by a senior player to social media.

2017
 North Pines avoided expulsion from the league after a club official ran onto the field during play and twice punched an opposition player. The official was suspended for seven years, and the club was ordered to employ a full-time security guard at all home games.
 Salisbury North were deducted 6 premiership points after a player was suspended for four matches for abusing and threatening a Division 1 reserves umpire.

2018
 Salisbury West's captain received a 27-game suspension for four incidents, including breaking an opponent's jaw, during a home Qualifying Final against Trinity Old Scholars which resulted in a life ban; this more than doubled the Adelaide Footy League's threshold of 12 weeks. Despite Salisbury West winning the game by nine points, the club was ejected from the finals and suspended from the league for the rest of the year.
Salisbury North were deregistered from the league after a player received an eight-week suspension for striking, and the league suspended all three of Salisbury North's senior teams for the rest of the 2018 season for breaking an amended affiliation agreement (AAA) regarding poor on-field behaviour

2021
 A Central United player was suspended for 10 matches and deregistered from the competition after striking a runner from the opposition team in a Division 7 game against Adelaide Lutheran.

Unbalanced Competition 
The league received media coverage in 2014 due to extreme scores in a number of games.
 Consideration was given to reorganising the divisional structure after Kilburn Football Club, in Division 3, was beaten by a combined 736 points in their first two games of the season, whilst forfeiting their B-Grade matches on the same two occasions. Kilburn later forfeited an A-Grade game against Salisbury when a few players misunderstood the start time and a few others could not find their way to the ground.
 Brahma Lodge were relegated from the Division 4 competition after losing a number of players.
 Mitchell Park and Flinders University were both reduced to one team each, with Flinders University taking the place of Mitchell Park's reserves in the Division 6 Reserves competition, due to an exodus of players.
 Blackfriars Old Scholars set a new SAAFL record score when they posted 71.30 (460) in a 429-point win against Angle Vale in Division 6. This resulting in the Angle Vale coach, Peter McMillan, quitting the following Tuesday night at a crisis meeting and being replaced by Reserves coach Rob Warren.
 Wingfield Royals forfeited a match in Division 7 against Smithfield on 24 May following six straight losses by an average of 198 points.
 Both Kilburn (in Division 3 against Pembroke Old Scholars) and Angle Vale (in Division 6 against Ingle Farm) forfeited their A-Grade games on 5 July.
 Salisbury West requested to be relegated from Division 3 to Division 5 after losing more than half their squad when they did not pay them for the second half of the 2014 season.

Governance 
An attempt to oust then President Gino Capogreco in October 2013 failed when the vote was defeated at an extraordinary meeting of the league. Mr. Capogreco was accused of altering a document and physically threatening a board member. Mr. Capogreco was later defeated at the following AGM.

See also 
 Australian rules football in South Australia
 SANFL

References

External links 
 

 
Australian rules football competitions in South Australia
Professional sports leagues in Australia